Parapercis tetracantha, the reticulated sandperch, is a fish species in the sandperch family, Pinguipedidae. It is found in the Bay of Bengal to seas around Japan and Indonesia throughout the Indo-West Pacific region. This species can reach a length of  TL.

References

Masuda, H., K. Amaoka, C. Araga, T. Uyeno and T. Yoshino, 1984. The fishes of the Japanese Archipelago. Vol. 1. Tokai University Press, Tokyo, Japan. 437 p.

Pinguipedidae
Taxa named by Bernard Germain de Lacépède
Fish described in 1802